The IFFI ICFT UNSESCO Gandhi Medal is an international honor instituted since the 46th International Film Festival of India. The annual award is presented to an outstanding film which promotes peace and inter-cultural dialogue.

History
In the year 1994, UNESCO issued a commemorative medal, marking the 125th anniversary of the birth of Mahatma Gandhi. Subsequently, since 2015, ICFT, the UNESCO international advisory body on all matters concerned with film, television and news media, headquartered in Paris France, in collaboration with International Film Festival of India, honors the commemorative Fellini Award to an outstanding film that best reflects Mahatma Gandhi's ideals of peace, tolerance and non-violence.

Medal Winners

References

External links
Official Page for Directorate of Film Festivals, India

Lists of Indian award winners
International Film Festival of India
Indian film festivals
Festivals in Goa
Awards for best film